The Drang-Drung Glacier (also called Durung Drung Glacier) is a mountain glacier near the Pensi La pass on the Kargil-Zanskar Road in the Kargil district of Ladakh in India.

The Drang-Drung Glacier is a long river of ice and snow, a source of the Stod River, a tributary of the Zanskar River, itself a tributary of the Indus River. Doda Peak with an elevation of  rises from the glacier.

Access 
The Drang-Drung Glacier is accessible from Srinagar or Srinagar Airport in two days,  by car or bus along NH 1D, which connects Srinagar and Leh through the towns of Ganderbal, Kangan, Sonamarg, and Dras. Kargil town is at the half-way point. From Kargil the glacier lies on the right side of Kargil-Zanaskar Road which passes through a gorge of the Suru River and below two mountain peaks, Nun and Kun. After crossing the Pensi La mountain pass a trek of one day from the road leads to the head of Drang-Drung glacier. The road is only open to traffic from May–September due to heavy snowfall at Zojila and Pensi La passes, and the best time to visit is July to August.

References

Kargil district
Geography of Ladakh
Glaciers of Ladakh
Ladakh